The Blackstone Chronicles is a serialized novel by American horror and suspense author John Saul. The series consists of six installments and takes place in a fictional New Hampshire town called Blackstone.  The series has been adapted into both a computer game and graphic novel.

Plot
The Blackstone Chronicles follows the lives of several people in the fictional town of Blackstone, New Hampshire. An uninhabited asylum was set to be demolished for a new shopping mall, only for the funding to be withdrawn at the last moment. The series follows a different character each chapter as they receive a "gift" from an anonymous source and the terrible things that happen to the recipient (or those around them) shortly thereafter. The books also follow the character of Oliver Metcalf, editor of the local paper, who had previously grown up on the asylum's grounds and suspects that a single source is behind each of the tragedies that befall the gifts' recipients. The final novel reveals the connection between the various objects and the identity of the mysterious gift-giver.

Publication details
 An Eye for an Eye: The Doll  Publisher: Fawcett Books (December 28, 1996)  Paperback  82 pages 
 Twist of Fate: The Locket  Publisher: Fawcett Books (January 29, 1997)  Paperback  86 pages 
 Ashes to Ashes: The Dragon's Flame  Publisher: Fawcett Books (February, 1997)  Paperback  86 pages
 In the Shadow of Evil: The Handkerchief  Publisher: Fawcett Books (March 30, 1997)  Paperback 96 pages 
 Day of Reckoning: The Stereoscope  Publisher: Fawcett Books (1997)  Paperback  84 pages 
 Asylum Publisher: Fawcett Books (June 1997)  Paperback  97 pages

The series was later reprinted in an omnibus edition as The Blackstone Chronicles: The Serial Thriller Complete in One Volume! (544 pages).

The Blackstone Chronicles in other media

Computer game

In 1998 Mindscape published a multimedia computer game developed by Legend Entertainment. The game,  titled John Saul's Blackstone Chronicles: An Adventure in Terror, is a sequel to the novels and takes place several years after the sixth book. The game follows Oliver Metcalf (the main protagonist of the novels) as he attempts to find his missing son Joshua, who has been hidden somewhere in the Blackstone Asylum by Malcolm Metcalf, Oliver's seemingly dead father. The object of play is to rescue Joshua and uncover the elder Metcalf's agenda. Malcolm Metcalf was voiced by Henry Strozier.

Critical reception for the game was mixed to negative, with GameSpot giving the game a rating of 5.5 and writing "The Blackstone Chronicles isn't a bad game. It's just average to a fault".

Graphic novel
In 2011 a graphic novel adaptation of John Saul's Blackstone Chronicles by Bluewater Productions was announced, with the first issue having a November 2011 release date.

Unmade miniseries
The Blackstone Chronicles was at one point licensed by ABC for a six-hour miniseries to air in 1998, but plans for the TV adaptation fell through.

References

External links
 Official author page
 Official publisher page for the Blackstone Chronicles

Novel series
American thriller novels
Novels first published in serial form